Nouadhibou Mosque is a mosque in Nouadhibou, Mauritania. It is located just to the east of Nouadhibou Cemetery.

See also
 Islam in Mauritania

References

Mosques in Mauritania
Nouadhibou